Slovenia competed at the 2018 European Athletics Championships in Berlin, Germany, from 6 to 12 August 2018. The country was represented by 10 athletes, four men and six women.

Results

Men

Track & road events

Field Events

Women

Track & road events

Field Events

Key
Q = Qualified for the next round
q = Qualified for the next round as a fastest loser or, in field events, by position without achieving the qualifying target
NR = National record
N/A = Round not applicable for the event
Bye = Athlete not required to compete in round

References

Nations at the 2018 European Athletics Championships
Slovenia at the European Athletics Championships
2018 in Slovenian sport